Faux-Mazuras is a commune in the Creuse department in the Nouvelle-Aquitaine region in central France.

Geography
A small farming village situated some  southof Guéret at the junction of the D8, D36 and the D37 roads. Coal was mined here for around 100 years until the mid-20th century.

Population

Sights
 The abandoned church at Faux, dating from the fifteenth century.
 Two sixteenth-century stone crosses.
 The sixteenth-century chapel at Mazuras.

See also
Communes of the Creuse department

References

Communes of Creuse